Interstate 69 (I-69) in the US state of Kentucky is a  freeway running from Fulton to Henderson. The route makes use of the entirety of the former Purchase Parkway and existing portions of I-24, the Western Kentucky Parkway, and the Pennyrile Parkway. Eventually, I-69 will leave the former Pennyrile Parkway just south of the Audubon Parkway interchange or remain on its current alignment and travel through Henderson on U.S. Route 41 (US 41) north into Indiana.

I-69 has been divided into three sections of independent utility (SIUs) through Kentucky. SIUs 5 and 6 encompass existing freeways. Federal legislation has designated the route for these sections and Kentucky is in the process of installing I-69 signs on the route. SIU 4 includes a new bridge over the Ohio River between Henderson and Evansville, Indiana. The proposed funding formula calls for Kentucky to finance two-thirds of the projected $1.4-billion bridge, while Indiana would pay for the remaining third.

Route description
I-69 in Kentucky begins at the Tennessee state line at Fulton. It travels north on the former Purchase Parkway to Mayfield, where it bypasses the city to the west and north, passing interchanges with Kentucky Route 80 (KY 80), KY 121, and US 45, after which it heads northeast away from the city, passing through rural areas of Western Kentucky. Exit 41 provides access to US 641 in Benton. I-69 interchanges with US 68 at exit 47 near Draffenville. Just south of Calvert City, I-24 from the west joins I-69. At exit 42 of I-24, I-69 splits off and heads northeast, serving the communities of Princeton and Dawson Springs. At exit 106, the highway meets the western terminus of the Western Kentucky Parkway and the northern terminus of I-169. I-69 then makes a sharp turn to the north, passing by Mortons Gap, Madisonville, and Sebree. A trumpet interchange with KY 425 is located in the southern part of Henderson. Immediately after KY 425 is the western terminus of the Audubon Parkway. I-69 in Kentucky meets its current northern terminus at US 41 in Henderson.

History
On May 15, 2006, Kentucky Governor Ernie Fletcher announced that I-69 will encompass  of existing parkways and a  segment of I-24. To reflect this decision by state and federal officials, crews began erecting Future I-69 signs along the following highway segments:

 Western Kentucky Parkway between I-24 and Pennyrile Parkway, 
 Pennyrile Parkway between Western Kentucky Parkway and US 41,

Federal legislation
On May 2, 2008, the United States House of Representatives passed HR-1195 (SAFETEA-LU Technical Corrections Act of 2008) which designates the Pennyrile Parkway from Henderson to Nortonville and the Western Kentucky Parkway from Nortonville to I-24 at Eddyville as Future I-69. It further designates the Audubon Parkway as a future spur (I-X69) of I-69 once necessary upgrades are completed. Then-President George W. Bush signed the bill on June 6, 2008, and Future I-69 signs began appearing on the parkways in the middle of 2008. This legislation applied the Future I-69 designation to the following roadways:
 Pennyrile Parkway from just south of the Audubon Parkway in Henderson to the Western Kentucky Parkway in Nortonville (future I-569)
 Western Kentucky Parkway from the Pennyrile Parkway to I-24 in Eddyville 
 I-24 from Eddyville to the Purchase Parkway in Calvert City
 Purchase Parkway from I-24 to the US 51 interchange at the Tennessee state line

All four highways, except for the section of the Purchase Parkway south of Mayfield, are now signed as I-69. Signage and milemarker posts were changed in mid-December 2012.

SIU 5
A 2007 engineering study for SIU 5 identified then-current conditions along the Pennyrile and Western Kentucky parkways. The report identified seven overpasses that fell short of the  minimum vertical clearance necessary for Interstate Highways. Most—if not all—of the aforementioned bridges were built during construction of the parkways in the 1960s and are nearing the end of their serviceable lifespans and due to be replaced. The main issues concerning the 16 interchanges in SIU 5 were short acceleration/deceleration lanes (the average is  while Interstate standards mandate ) and tight curve radiuses at interchanges with loop ramps. A particular challenge was reconfiguring the cloverleaf interchange between the Pennyrile and Western Kentucky parkways in Nortonville to accommodate the future movement of traffic primarily between points north and points west.

According to the Kentucky Transportation Cabinet (KYTC) 2006 Six-Year Transportation Plan Executive Summary, the KYTC "recently completed a study of the parkway upgrade needs from Interstate 24 to Henderson" (SIU 5). The summary further stated that "Continuing work on Interstate 69 in Kentucky will depend upon the financial support that can be garnered for the project through federal reauthorization and appropriations processes". The Transportation Plan estimated that the cost of upgrading the parkways would be about $700 million.

Nonetheless, the required improvements may be performed on individual segments of the parkways when the existing road surfaces reach the end of their lifespans, in what are known as "Pavement Preservation Projects". During a pavement preservation project, the existing pavement is removed, repairs are made to the highway's sub-base, and the road is then resurfaced. During such a project, bridges and overpasses may be rehabilitated or replaced, drainage systems are upgraded, and other modifications are made to improve safety on the road without completely reconstructing it, allowing it to remain at least partially open during construction.

Two projects on the Pennyrile Parkway and the Western Kentucky Parkway in Hopkins County were evidence that Kentucky took this approach. In 2007, work began on a $14.9-million (equivalent to $ in ) project to replace  of pavement on the Pennyrile Parkway segment slated for the I-69 designation. A similar $23-million project (equivalent to $ in ) in 2005 replaced and upgraded  of pavement on the Western Kentucky Parkway west of the interchange with the Pennyrile Parkway, which was also slated to become part of I-69.

Several public meetings were held in towns along the parkways in late November and early December 2007 where Kentucky officials provided detailed information on upgrading the parkways, including changes to the projected cost for the upgrades. The adjusted cost of upgrading the parkways in SIUs 5 and 6 was pegged at around $300 million, significantly lower than initial estimates of $700 million. Of that $300-million pricetag, high-priority projects accounted for about half ($145 million) of the total cost. Kentucky transportation officials also raised the idea of applying for a waiver that would allow the parkways to immediately be signed as I-69, making the parkways eligible for federal Interstate Highway funds to complete the upgrades. Without the I-69 designation, the parkway sections slated to become I-69 would not be eligible for Interstate Highway funds for upgrades. Kentucky officials announced that no funding for I-69 was included in the 2008–2014 Transportation Improvement Plan.

In January 2010, then Governor Steve Beshear released the next draft Six-Year Plan for consideration by the Kentucky General Assembly. The proposed plan included the reconstruction of several interchanges on the Pennyrile and Western Kentucky parkways. The proposed work would upgrade the interchanges to Interstate standards as required to get the parkways signed as I-69. Pending approval and funding, the interchange work would begin in 2012 and be finished by 2015.

In 2014, work began on the required upgrades to the Pennyrile Parkway in anticipation of the I-69 designation. The cloverleaf interchange with I-69/Western Kentucky Parkway was modified to allow highspeed movements between points north and points west. During the same time frame, several interchanges along the Pennyrile were also reconstructed, and cable barriers were installed in the median. In April 2015, the KYTC awarded a $3-million contract (equivalent to $ in ) to install I-69 and US 41 signs on the Pennyrile Parkway. The work was completed on November 16, 2015.

SIU 6
I-69's designation along the Purchase Parkway from I-24 to the Tennessee state line at South Fulton, Tennessee, was written into law with the fiscal year 2002 Transportation Appropriations Bill. However, many of the same issues that are being addressed in SIU 5 arise in SIU 6 as well, and the Commonwealth of Kentucky is upgrading the Purchase Parkway in a similar fashion. The massive interchange with US 45 and US 51 at the Tennessee state line in South Fulton is the main challenge for completing SIU 6 and has been broken out as a separate project from SIUs 6 and 7.

Kentucky is the only state that will be routing nearly its entire portion of I-69 over existing freeways, allowing the state to avoid years of costly environmental studies, and thereby enabling the KYTC to upgrade the parkways to I-69 as soon as funding becomes available. Technically, the Commonwealth of Kentucky could request a waiver from the American Association of State Highway and Transportation Officials (AASHTO) that would allow the state to apply the I-69 designation to its parkways before upgrades are completed, but this would only be able to have been done if adjoining segments in Tennessee or Indiana are completed first.

The Purchase Parkway has been designated as future I-69, but the route could not be signed as I-69 until several interchanges, including the interchange with I-24, are upgraded to Interstate standards. The northern portion of the parkway between Mayfield and I-24, including the reconfiguration of the KY 348 interchange at Benton from a toll-booth design (with opposing loop ramps) to a diamond interchange, the installation of cable barriers in the narrow parkway median, and resurfacing of the mainline to increase bridge clearances and lengthen merge lanes at other interchanges along this section was part of the upgrade to I-69. A $37-million contract (equivalent to $ in ) to reconstruct the I-24/Purchase Parkway interchange was awarded to Jim Smith Contracting Company on November 20, 2015. Construction on the I-24/Purchase Parkway interchange began in early 2016, with the project completed in July 2018.  A similar contract to reconstruct the parkway interchanges at the south end of the Mayfield Bypass (exit 21) and KY 80 was let in February 2016. A contract for the conversion of the last remaining tollbooth-style interchange requiring reconfiguration, located at KY 339 in Wingo (exit 14), was awarded in December 2022. The redesign is under construction and is scheduled for completion in 2024. After construction, I-69 will be extended down to Fulton. The section of the Purchase Parkway north of Mayfield received I-69 signage in July 2018.

SIU 7
The interchange between the Purchase Parkway, US 45, and US 51 straddles the Tennessee state line between the cities of Fulton, Kentucky, and South Fulton, Tennessee. Officially part of SIU 7, the interchange was broken out from the environmental impact statement (EIS) prepared by the Tennessee Department of Transportation (TDOT) for SIU 7 at a time when Tennessee was moving forward with planning for the remainder of SIU 7 (all of which, except for a  section of the Purchase Parkway approaching the Fulton–South Fulton interchange, lies within Tennessee). It was agreed upon by the Federal Highway Administration (FHWA), the KYTC, and TDOT to prepare a separate environmental assessment (EA)/EIS for the Fulton–South Fulton interchange when both states were ready to perform its reconfiguration to accommodate I-69. As Tennessee continues to make progress toward completing the unbuilt portion of SIU 7 to the south and Kentucky's upgrades to the Purchase Parkway from the north, both states indicated their intention to start work on reconfiguring the Fulton–South Fulton interchange. A joint EA/EIS will be prepared by the KYTC and TDOT and submitted to the FHWA for a record of decision (ROD) prior to right-of-way acquisition and construction. The 2016 Kentucky Six Year Road Plan includes $7.8 million in fiscal years 2019 through 2022 to complete environmental studies, ROW acquisition, and utility relocation in anticipation of reconstructing the interchange thereafter.

SIU 4
SIU 4 is still in the planning stages, but Kentucky and Indiana had planned to finance a new bridge across the Ohio River with tolls. The preferred alternative for SIU 4 was to leave the Pennyrile Parkway near its north end and cross the Ohio River to the former I-164 near Evansville, Indiana, and then use the former I-164 to I-64; most of I-164 was redesignated as I-69 in 2014. But the Ohio River bridge plan had stalled in the late 2000s and early 2010s, due to lack of funding from both states. However, with the completion of SIU 5 in Kentucky and with I-69 connected to Indianapolis via Indiana State Road 37 in Indiana, both states have made completing the Ohio River Bridge a top priority.

On June 30, 2016, then-Governor Mike Pence (Indiana) and then-Governor Matt Bevin (Kentucky) announced an agreement to resume environmental studies and develop a funding strategy to complete the Ohio River Bridge and its approaches. Indiana will contribute $17 million to restart and lead the environmental studies that will culminate in an approved EIS and ROD that will allow construction to begin. Environmental studies are expected to take about three years to complete, with right-of-way acquisition and construction expected to begin thereafter. Parsons Transportation Group, a California-based firm with offices in Indiana, was picked to complete environmental and preliminary design work on November 15, 2016. Kentucky has committed over $43 million in its 2016 Six-Year Highway Plan for design and right-of-way acquisition for the bridge.

Kentucky Governor Andy Beshear has proposed $267 million in his first Six-Year Highway Plan for the I-69 bridge. Of that, $77 million would become available from 2020 to 2022 and the rest from 2023 to 2026. The proposed money source would develop the project and then begin a portion of construction running from KY 425/Henderson Bypass to US 60. The financial situation regarding the current COVID-19 pandemic, only $37 million was approved due to possible budget deficits.

On September 16, 2021, a combined final EIS and ROD was issued. It went to the design–build bid of Ragle Inc. and Stantec Consulting Services, Inc. for $158 million. Groundbreaking took place on June 23, 2022, and construction of the first phase is scheduled to complete in 2025. Construction for phase 2 will begin 2027. It will extend I-69 from US 60 to Evansville, Indiana which includes a new Ohio Rover crossing bridge. It is expected to be completed in 2031 in which I-69 will connect Indiana to Kentucky.

Exit list

Auxiliary routes
: Includes the first  of the former Edward T. Breathitt Pennyrile Parkway from I-24 in Christian County to the I-69/Western Kentucky Parkway junction near Nortonville.
: A proposed auxiliary route to run the current course of the Western Kentucky Parkway from its current western terminus at I-69 to the junction with I-165.

See also

References

69
 Kentucky
Transportation in Fulton County, Kentucky
Transportation in Graves County, Kentucky
Transportation in Marshall County, Kentucky
Transportation in Livingston County, Kentucky
Transportation in Lyon County, Kentucky
Transportation in Caldwell County, Kentucky
Transportation in Hopkins County, Kentucky
Transportation in Webster County, Kentucky
Transportation in Henderson County, Kentucky